Procedure words (abbreviated to prowords) are words or phrases limited to radio telephone procedure used to facilitate communication by conveying information in a condensed standard verbal format. Prowords are voice versions of the much older procedural signs for Morse code which were first developed in the 1860s for Morse telegraphy, and their meaning is identical. 

The NATO communications manual ACP-125 contains the most formal and perhaps earliest modern (post-World War II) glossary of prowords, but its definitions have been adopted by many other organizations, including the United Nations Development Programme, the U.S. Coast Guard, US Civil Air Patrol, US Military Auxiliary Radio System, and others.

Prowords are one of several structured parts of radio voice procedures, including brevity codes and plain language radio checks.

Examples 
According to the U.S. Marine Corps training document FMSO 108, "understanding the following PROWORDS and their respective definitions is the key to clear and concise communication procedures".

This is ... 
This transmission is from the station whose designator immediately follows. For clarity, the station called should be named before the station calling. So, "Victor Juliet zero, THIS IS Golf Mike Oscar three..." ), for brevity, "Victor Juliet zero, Golf Mike Oscar three, ROGER, OUT". Never "This is GMO3 calling VJ0", "This is ground control to Major Tom", nor any other reversed combination.

Over
"This is the end of my transmission to you and a response is necessary. Go ahead: transmit."

"Over" and "Out" are never used at the same time, since their meanings are mutually exclusive. With spring-loaded Push to talk (PTT) buttons on modern combined transceivers, the same meaning can be communicated with just "OUT", as in "Ops, Alpha, ETA five minutes. OUT."

Out
"This is the end of my transmission to you and no answer is required or expected."

Do you read? 
A question about whether the receiver can hear and understand the transmission.

Example: "Bob, you read me? What is the situation from your position?"

Example:

Roger
"I have received your last transmission satisfactorily, radio check is LOUD AND CLEAR." "ROGER" may be used to mean "yes" with regard to confirming a command; however, in Air Traffic Control phraseology, it does not signify that a clearance has been given.

The term originates from the practice of telegraphers sending an "R" to stand for "received" after successfully getting a message. This was extended into spoken radio during World War II, with the "R" changed to the spelling alphabet equivalent word "Roger". The modern NATO spelling alphabet uses the word "Romeo" for "R" instead of "Roger", and "Romeo" is sometimes used for the same purpose as "Roger", mainly in Australian maritime operations.

For commercial maritime VHF, "Roger" is discouraged.

"Copy" does not mean the same as "roger". It is used when communications between two other stations which includes information for one's own station has been overheard and received satisfactorily.

Wilco

"I understand and will comply." It is used on receipt of an order. "Roger" and "Wilco" used together (e.g. "Roger, Wilco") are redundant, since "Wilco" includes the acknowledgement element of "Roger".

Say again 
"I have not understood your message, please SAY AGAIN". Usually used with prowords "ALL AFTER" or "ALL BEFORE". Example: radio working between Solent Coastguard and a motor vessel, call-sign EG 93, where part of the initial transmission is unintelligible.

Example:

At this juncture, Solent Coastguard would reply, giving the position of the shipping vessel preceded with the prowords "I SAY AGAIN":

The word "REPEAT" should not be used in place of "SAY AGAIN", especially in the vicinity of naval or other firing ranges, as "REPEAT" is an artillery proword defined in ACP 125 U.S. Supp-2(A) with the wholly different meaning of "request for the same volume of fire to be fired again with or without corrections or changes" (e.g., at the same coordinates as the previous round).

All after...
"Please repeat the message you just sent me beginning after the word or phrase said after this proword."

All before...
"Please repeat the message you just sent me ending before the word or phrase said after this proword."

Wait over
"I must pause for a few seconds."

Wait out
"I must pause for longer than a few seconds. I will call you back."

Read back
"Please repeat my entire transmission back to me."

I read back
"The following is my response to your READ BACK proword."

Correction
"I made an error in this transmission. Transmission will continue with the last word correctly sent."

Radio check
"What is my signal strength and readability; how do you hear me?"

The sender requests a response indicating the strength and readability of their transmission, according to plain language radio check standards:
 A response of ROGER is shorthand for the prowords LOUD AND CLEAR.
 A response of WEAK BUT READABLE ("WEAK READABLE" is also used) indicates a weak signal but I can understand.
 A response of WEAK AND DISTORTED indicates a weak signal and unreadable.
 A response of STRONG BUT DISTORTED indicates a strong signal but unreadable. One of the two stations might be slightly off frequency, there might be multipath distortion, or there might be a problem with the audio circuits on one or both of the radios.

"5 by 5" is an older term used to assess radio signals, as in 5 out of 5 units for both signal strength and readability. Other terms similar to 5x5 are "LOUD AND CLEAR" or "Lima and Charlie". Example:

Similar example in shorter form:

If the initiating station (Alpha 12 in the example) cannot hear the responding station (X-ray 23 above), then the initiator attempts a radio-check again, or if the responder's signal was not heard, the initiator replies to the responder with "Negative contact, Alpha 12 OUT".

The following readability scale is used: 1 = bad (unreadable); 2 = poor (readable now and then); 3 = fair (readable, but with difficulty); 4 = good (readable); 5 = excellent (perfectly readable).

Example of correct US Army radio check, for receiver A-11 (Alpha 11) and sender D-12 (Delta 12):

Article 32 Radio Regulations distress and rescue 
International Telecommunication Union (ITU) Radio Regulations and the International Civil Aviation Organization (ICAO) Convention and Procedures for Air Navigation Services set out "distress, urgency and safety procedures". 

On the radio, distress (emergency) and rescue usage takes precedence above all other usage, and the radio stations at the scene of the disaster (on land, in a plane, or on a boat) are authorized to commandeer the frequency and prohibit all transmissions that are not involved in assisting them. These procedure words originate in the International Radio Regulations. 

The Combined Communications-Electronics Board (representing military use by Australia, Canada, New Zealand, United Kingdom and United States) sets out their usage in the Allied Communications Publications "ACP 135(F) Communications instructions Distress and Rescue Procedures".

Mayday

Mayday is used internationally as the official SOS/distress call for voice. It means that the caller, their vessel or a person aboard the vessel is in grave and imminent danger, send immediate assistance. This call takes priority over all other calls.

The correct format for a Mayday call is as follows:

[The first part of the signal is known as the "call"]
Mayday, Mayday, Mayday,
This is (vessel name repeated three times, followed by call sign if available)
[The subsequent part of the signal is known as the "message"]

Mayday (vessel name)
My position is (position as a lat-long position or bearing and distance from a fixed point)
I am (type of distress, e.g. on fire and sinking)
I require immediate assistance
I have (number of people on board and their condition)
(Any other information e.g. "I am abandoning to life rafts")
Over

VHF instructors, specifically those working for the Royal Yachting Association, often suggest the mnemonic MIPDANIO for learning the message of a Mayday signal: mayday, identify, position, distress, assistance, number-of-crew, information, over.

In aviation a different format is used:

[First part of the message] Mayday, Mayday, Mayday
[Second part of the message] Callsign
[Third part of the message] Nature of the emergency

For example: "Mayday, Mayday, Mayday, Wiki Air 999, we have lost both of our engines due to a bird strike, we are gliding now."

After that pilot can give, or the controller can ask for, additional information, such as, fuel and number of passengers on board.

Pan-Pan 

Pan-pan (pronounced ) is the official urgency voice call.

Meaning "I, my vessel or a person aboard my vessel requires assistance but is not in distress." This overrides all but a mayday call, and is used, as an example, for calling for medical assistance or if the station has no means of propulsion. The correct usage is:

Pan-Pan, Pan-Pan, Pan-Pan 
All stations, all stations, all stations
This is [vessel name repeated three times]
My position is [position as a lat-long position or bearing and distance from a fixed point]
I am [type of urgency, e.g. drifting without power in a shipping lane]
I require [type of assistance required]
[Any other information e.g. size of vessel, which may be important for towing]
Over

SÉCURITÉ 

Pronounced  , this is the official safety voice call.

"I have important meteorological, navigational or safety information to pass on." 
This call is normally broadcast on a defined channel (channel 16 for maritime VHF) and then moved onto another channel to pass the message. Example:

[On channel 16]

SÉCURITÉ, SÉCURITÉ, SÉCURITÉ

All stations, all stations, all stations.

This is Echo Golf niner three, Echo Golf niner three, Echo Golf niner three.

For urgent navigational warning, listen on channel six-seven.

OUT

[Then on channel 67]

SÉCURITÉ, SÉCURITÉ, SÉCURITÉ

All stations, all stations, all stations.

This is Echo Golf niner tree (three), Echo Golf niner tree, Echo Golf niner tree.

Floating debris sighted off Calshot Spit.

Considered a danger to surface navigation.

OUT

SEELONCE MAYDAY
"Seelonce" is an approximation rendition of the French word silence. Indicates that your vessel has an emergency and that you are requiring radio silence from all other stations not assisting you.

SEELONCE DISTRESS
Indicates that you are relaying or assisting a station that has placed a MAYDAY call and you are requiring radio silence from all other stations not assisting you or the station in distress.

When the emergency issue is winding down and then has been resolved, these prowords are used to open up the frequency for use by stations not involved in the emergency:

PRU-DONCE
Indicates that complete radio silence is no longer required and restricted (limited) use of the frequency may resume, but immediately giving way to all further distress communications.

SEELONCE FEENEE
Indicates that emergency communications have ceased and normal use of the frequency may resume.

ACP 125(F)

Aviation radio
More formally known as "Aeronautical Mobile communications", radio communications from and to aircraft are governed by rules created by the International Civil Aviation Organization. ICAO defines a very similar but shorter list of prowords in Annex 10 of its Radiotelephony Procedures (to the Convention on International Civil Aviation). Material in the following table is quoted from their list. ICAO also defines "ICAO Radio Telephony Phraseology".

Marine radio
Marine radio procedure words follow from the ACP-125 definition, and those in the International Radio Regulations published by the ITU, and should be used by small vessels as their standard radio procedure. Beginning in 2001, large vessels, defined as being 500 gross tonnage or greater, the International Convention on Standards of Training, Certification and Watchkeeping for Seafarers has required that a restricted and simplified English vocabulary with pre-set phrases, called Standard Marine Communication Phrases (SMCP), be used and understood by all officers in charge of a navigational watch. These rules are enforced by the International Maritime Organization (IMO). The IMO describes the purpose of SMCP, explaining "The IMO SMCP includes phrases which have been developed to cover the most important safety-related fields of verbal shore-to-ship (and vice-versa), ship-to-ship and on-board communications. The aim is to get round the problem of language barriers at sea and avoid misunderstandings which can cause accidents."

The SMCP language is not free-form like the standard radio voice procedures and procedure words. Instead, it consists of entire pre-formed phrases carefully designed for each situation, and watch officers must pass a test of their usage in order to be certified under international maritime regulations. For example, ships in their own territorial waters might be allowed to use their native language, but when navigating at sea or communicating with foreign vessels in their own territorial waters, they should switch to SMCP, and will state the switch over the radio before using the procedures. When it is necessary to indicate that the SMCP are to be used, the following message may be sent: "Please use Standard Marine Communication Phrases." "I will use Standard Marine Communication Phrases."

SMCP
 "Yes" when the answer to a question is in the affirmative
 "No" when the answer to a question is in the negative
 "Stand by" when the information requested is not immediately available
 "No information" when the information requested cannot be obtained

Misusages

Clear
"Clear" is sometimes heard in amateur radio transmissions to indicate the sending station is done transmitting and leaving the airways, i.e. turning off the radio, but the Clear proword is reserved for a different purpose, that of specifying the classification of a 16-line format radio message as one which can be sent in the clear (without encryption), as well as being reserved for use in responding to the Radio Check proword to indicate the readability of the radio transmission.

Affirmative 
"Confirm" or "yes" and sometimes shortened to Affirm is heard in several radio services, but is not listed in ACP-125 as a proword because in poor radio conditions it can be confused with Negative. Instead, the proword Correct is used.

Negative
Means "no", and can be abbreviated to Negat. Because over a poor quality connection the words "affirmative" and "negative" can be mistaken for one another (for example over a sound-powered telephone circuit), United States Navy instruction omits the use of either as prowords. Sailors are instructed to instead use "yes" and "no".

Example of usage

Example 1
Two helicopters, call signs "Swiss 610" and "Swiss 613", are flying in formation :
 
Swiss 610:  "613, I have a visual on you at my 3 o'clock. 610"
Swiss 613:  "Roger 613"
Swiss 610:  "613, Turn right to a heading of 090. 610"
Swiss 613:  "Wilco 613"
 
Anytime a radio call is made (excepting "standby", where the correct response is silence), there is some kind of response indicating that the original call was heard. 613's "Roger" confirms to 610 that the information was heard. In the second radio call from 610, direction was given. 613's "Wilco" means "will comply."

Reading back an instruction confirms that it was heard correctly. For example, if all 613 says is "Wilco", 610 cannot be certain that he correctly heard the heading as 090. If 613 replies with a read back and the word "Wilco" ("Turn right zero-niner-zero, Wilco") then 610 knows that the heading was correctly understood, and that 613 intends to comply.

Example 2
The following is the example of working between two stations, EG93 and VJ50 demonstrating how to confirm information:

EG93:  "Victor Juliet five zero, Victor Juliet five zero, this is Echo Golf niner three. Request rendezvous at 51 degrees 37.0N, 001 degrees 49.5W. Read back for check. Over"
VJ50:  "Echo Golf niner three, this is Victor Juliet five zero. I read back: five one degrees three seven decimal zero north, zero zero one degrees four niner decimal five west. Over."
EG93:  "Victor Juliet five zero, this is Echo Golf niner three. Correct, Out"

See also 
 Allied Communication Procedures
 NATO phonetic alphabet
 Prosigns for Morse code
 Ten-code
 Distress signal
 Plain language radio checks

References

Notes

Bibliography
 FM 21-75
 Handbook for Marine Radio Communication, Fifth Edition

Military communications
Amateur radio
Parts of speech
Operating signals